Nikolay Kolev may refer to:

 Nikolay Kolev (discus thrower) (born 1968), Bulgarian discus thrower
 Nikolay Kolev (footballer) (born 1990), Bulgarian footballer
 Nikolay Kolev (journalist) (1932–2004), Bulgarian TV sports journalist
 Nikolay Kolev (rower, born 1950) (born 1950), Bulgarian Olympic rower
 Nikolay Kolev (rower, born 1973) (born 1973), Bulgarian Olympic rower
 Nikolay Kolev (weightlifter) (born 1978), Bulgarian weightlifter